Eucoleus is a genus of nematodes belonging to the family Capillariidae.

The genus has cosmopolitan distribution.

Species:

Eucoleus aerophilus 
Eucoleus annulatus 
Eucoleus bacillatus 
Eucoleus baskakowi 
Eucoleus boehemi 
Eucoleus boehmi 
Eucoleus contortus 
Eucoleus dispar 
Eucoleus dubius 
Eucoleus garfiai 
Eucoleus gastricus 
Eucoleus obtusiuscula 
Eucoleus oesophagicola 
Eucoleus perforans 
Eucoleus schvalovoj 
Eucoleus spiralis 
Eucoleus tenuis 
Eucoleus vanelli

References

Nematodes